The Soviet Union's 1989 nuclear test series was a group of 7 nuclear tests conducted in 1989. These tests  followed the 1988 Soviet nuclear tests series and preceded the 1990 Soviet nuclear tests series.

Nuclear tests

714
This was the last nuclear test at Semipalatinsk.

List of nuclear tests

References

1989
1989 in the Soviet Union
1989 in military history
Explosions in 1989